James Stuart or James Stewart (1701–1789) was a Scottish cleric. He was a minister in Killin and worked with poet Dugald Buchanan on the Scottish Gaelic New Testament published in 1767. His son, John Stuart (1743–1821) of Luss, continued to work on the Old Testament published in 1801. His daughter married James McLagan, minister at Amulree.

References

1701 births
1789 deaths
Translators of the Bible into Scottish Gaelic
18th-century Ministers of the Church of Scotland
18th-century British translators